Mûr-de-Bretagne (literally Mûr of Brittany) is a town and former commune in the Côtes-d'Armor department, Brittany, northwestern France. On 1 January 2017, the former commune was merged into the new commune Guerlédan.

Geography

Mûr-de-Bretagne is a small town with shops, located east of the Lac de Guerlédan.

Toponymy
The old forms of the name are: Mur (1283), Mur (1368), Mur (1516), Mur (1536), Meur (1630).

The name of the commune translated into Breton is Mur.

History

Transportation
The town was previously served by a train station. The line on which it was on is now a cycleway

Politics and administration

Demographics
In 2017, the municipality had 2,026 inhabitants. This population accounts for the former commune.

The inhabitants of Mûr-de-Bretagne are known in French as mûrois.

Local culture and heritage

Places and monuments

The chapel Sainte-Suzanne is classified as an historical monument since 4 June 1952. It is surrounded by oak trees painted around 1840-1850 by Jean-Baptiste Corot.
Church of Saint-Pierre: indoors, altars and chairs carved by a local artist. On the pulpit, sculpted panels represent the seven deadly sins.
The , classified as an historical monument on 8 November 1956.

 and Lake Guerlédan.

Sport

Mûr was the end of the fourth stage of the 2011 Tour de France; Cadel Evans won the stage in 2011 and went on to win the Tour. Mûr hosted the finish of the eighth stage of the 2015 Tour de France. Alexis Vuillermoz took the win. On 17 October 2017, it was announced it would be the finish line for the 6th stage of the 2018 Tour de France on 12 July 2018. Irish cyclist Dan Martin from  took the stage.

Heraldry

See also
Communes of the Côtes-d'Armor department
Lac de Guerlédan

Bibliography

References

External links

Former communes of Côtes-d'Armor